George Tyler may refer to:
 George Tyler (Royal Navy officer) (1792–1862), British Royal Navy officer, colonial governor, Conservative MP
 Sir George Tyler, 1st Baronet (1835–1897), Lord Mayor of London 1893–94
 Lefty Tyler (1889–1953), born George Albert Tyler, American professional baseball pitcher 1910–21
 George Tyler (rugby union) (1879–1942), New Zealand rugby union player
 George Tyler (cricketer) (1898–1976), English cricketer